CISK-FM is a Canadian radio station, which broadcasts Punjabi language programming at 94.3 MHz/FM, serving the Punjabi diaspora residing in Williams Lake, British Columbia. The station is owned by the Western Singh Sabha Association, which received approval from the CRTC on June 9, 2004. The station operates at 94.3 MHz with an effective radiated power of 35 watts.

References

External links
Gurdwara Sahib Western Singh Sahba
Sikhi Virsa CISK 94.3 FM

Isk
Isk
Punjabi-Canadian culture